John R Best is a male former badminton player from England.

Badminton career
Best won the mixed doubles during the 1954 All England Badminton Championships with Irish Cooley.

References

English male badminton players